Juan Gasparini (born 1949 in Azul, Buenos Aires) is an Argentinian investigative journalist and author.

He has a press cards in the Association of Correspondents of the United Nations.

Journalistic Books: Investigations and trials (1986-2009)

In Argentina 
 La Pista Suiza (1986) Buenos Aires, Lectorum Pubns Inc. 
 Montoneros: Final De Cuentas, Buenos Aires, Puntosur Editores, (1988). 
El crimen de Graiver (1990, Europa: Zeta  reedited as David Graiver – El banquero de los Montoneros),  2007, Norma 
 La Injusticia Federal: El Ocultamiento de los Jueces y la historia negra de la SIDE en los sobornos del Senado (2005) Buenos Aires: Edhasa 
 La Fuga del Brujo: Historia criminal de José López Rega (2005) Buenos Aires: Norma 
 Manuscrito de un desaparecido en la ESMA. El libro de Jorge Caffatti (2006) Buenos Aires: Norma 
 El pacto Menem+Kirchner (2009) Buenos Aires: Sudamericana

In Spain 
Después de la tormenta, las claves de la posguerra (1991, collective work after the first Gulf War);
Roldán-Paesa, la conexión suiza (1997, corruption in Spain and Switzerland); after word to the Spanish edition on Nazi Gold (1997) (L’or nazi), a book by Jean Ziegler, contribution on networks of laundering dirty money of the Nazi dictatorship in Spain, Portugal and Argentina; España: Akal 
Borges: la posesión póstuma (2000, the last days of Argentine writer Jorge Luis Borges in Geneva, translated into French by Éditions Timéli of Geneva in 2006); España: Softcover, Foca Ediciones y Distribuciones 
Mujeres de dictadores (2002, portraits of women of Augusto Pinochet, Fidel Castro, Alberto Fujimori, Ferdinand Marcos, Jorge Videla and Slobodan Milosevic), the latter two also being distributed in Latin America. México: Océano

Co-author 
with Norberto Bermúdez
El testigo secreto (Argentina-Spain, 1999, on the Spanish judge Baltasar Garzón) and, España: Javier Vergara Editor 
La prueba (2001, corruption in Argentina); España: Javier Vergara Editor 
La delgada línea blanca (2000) with Rodrigo de Castro. Europa: Ediciones B, Grupo Zeta

Literary Awards 
 Rodolfo Walsh price for literature non-fiction (2001)
In the international contest Semana Negra of Gijón, Spain, with Rodrigo de Castro, for the book La delgada línea blanca, investigation into Pinochet’s dictatorship in Chile and links with Argentina

 Price Nicolas Bouvier Media (2007)
In the contest’s 10th anniversary of the Swiss Club de la Presse in Geneva with Carole Vann. For investigative journalism on confidential reports to the United Nations of violations of human rights in Iran and Uzbekistan, French and English, in the website Tribune of Human Rights in the newspapers Le Temps and Le Courrier.

References

See also
Paulina Veloso
United Nations Human Rights Council

Argentine journalists
Male journalists
Argentine male writers
People from Buenos Aires
1949 births
Living people
Graduate Institute of International and Development Studies alumni